Irvine United Presbyterian Church is a historic Presbyterian church located at Brokenstraw Township, Warren County, Pennsylvania.  It was built in 1837, and is a one-story, fieldstone building with a gable roof in the Greek Revival style.  It is three bays wide and three bays deep, measuring 22 feet by 32 feet.

It was added to the National Register of Historic Places in 1976.

References

External links

Historic American Buildings Survey in Pennsylvania
Presbyterian churches in Pennsylvania
Churches on the National Register of Historic Places in Pennsylvania
Greek Revival church buildings in Pennsylvania
Churches completed in 1837
19th-century Presbyterian church buildings in the United States
Churches in Warren County, Pennsylvania
National Register of Historic Places in Warren County, Pennsylvania